Shinjuku is one of the 23 special wards of Tokyo, Japan.
Shinjuku may also refer to:

Places in Japan
Shinjuku Station, a train station located in Shinjuku and Shibuya wards in Tokyo, Japan
Seibu-Shinjuku Station
Shinjuku-sanchōme Station
Minami-Shinjuku Station
Nishi-Shinjuku Station
Shinjuku-gyoemmae Station

Shinjuku, a region in the city of Tatebayashi, Gunma
Shinjuku, a region in the ward of Chūō-ku, Chiba
Shinjuku, a region in the city of Zushi, Kanagawa
Shinjuku, a town in the city of Numazu, Shizuoka
Shinjuku, a town in the city of Toyokawa, Aichi

Entertainment
Shinjuku Incident, a 2009 Hong Kong crime drama film written and directed by Derek Yee and starring Jackie Chan
VR Zone Shinjuku, a Bandai Namco-owned virtual reality theme park arcade

See also
Shinju (disambiguation)
Shinju-kyo